The Philippines women's national baseball team is the national team of the Philippines which represents the country in women's baseball. It is organized by the Philippine Amateur Baseball Association (PABA).

History
The Philippine Amateur Baseball Association began the process for forming the Philippine women's national baseball in 2018. PABA conducted tryouts with some of the players of the team also softball players. They debuted in competitive baseball at the 2019 Women's Baseball Asian Cup with only around half-a-year of preparations which involves scrimmages against local Philippine high school and college men's teams. They finished third in the tournament clinching a qualification berth for their first Women's Baseball World Cup in 2020.

The Philippines was also supposed to play at the 2019 Southeast Asian Games to be hosted at home, but women's baseball was scrapped from the regional games' calendar due to Indonesia being the only other country to signify interest to enter a women's baseball event at the games.

The national team was supposed to play in 2020 at the Women's Baseball World Cup. However the tournament was postponed due to the COVID-19 pandemic. Initially planning to train in Japan and participate in tournaments in Hong Kong as part of the team's preparation for the World Cup, their training was modified due to logistical issues caused by the pandemic. Team members had to resort to online means and train individually.

Primary national team tournament records

Women's Baseball World Cup
The Philippines was to make its first appearance at the Women's Baseball World Cup in its second edition after it finished third in the 2019 Women's Baseball Asian Cup where the top four teams qualified for the tournament.

Women's Baseball Asian Cup
The Philippine national team debuted in the Women's Baseball Asian Cup in the 2019 edition. It is also their very first international competition. Aiming a podium finish, the Philippines won their first competitive fixture in the opening round with them prevailing 12–3 against Hong Kong. They advanced to the Super round after securing a win against South Korea. In the Super Round, the Philippines conceded matches against Japan and Chinese Taipei, but won over host, China. Their finishing set up a rematch with the China in the bronze medal match with the Philippines clinching a 11–1 win over the hosts.

 Champions   Runners up   Third place   Fourth place

See also
Philippines men's national baseball team
Philippines men's national softball team
Philippines women's national softball team

References

 
Women's national baseball teams
Women's national sports teams of the Philippines